NHS Highland is one of the fourteen regions of NHS Scotland. In 2016–17 it had an operating budget of £780 million. It provides prehospital care, primary and secondary care services.

Organisational structure
NHS Highland is composed of two Health and Social Care Partnerships (HSCPs):

 The Highland Health and Social Care partnership covers the local government area of Highland. It has two main divisions:
 The North and West operational unit covers Caithness, Sutherland, Lochaber and Skye, Lochalsh and Wester Ross.
 The Inner Moray Firth operating unit covers Raigmore Hospital, Badenoch and Strathspey, Mid Ross, Inverness and Nairn.

 The Argyll and Bute Health and Social Care Partnership covers the local government area of Argyll and Bute.

History
On 1 October 2001 NHS Highland health board was established. NHS Highland's first board members were announced 10 days later. In 2005 Community Health Partnerships (CHPs) were introduced.

On 1 April 2006, NHS Highland took over responsibility for part of the former NHS Argyll and Clyde region (corresponding approximately to the Argyll and Bute council area), the other part of which was transferred to NHS Greater Glasgow and Clyde.

On 1 April 2012 NHS Highland became the lead agency responsible for Adult Social Care services, with the council taking over issues relating to children.

It directly employs over 10,500 people and there are also around 1,000 primary care staff in the region.

In December 2014, Broadford, Skye was chosen as the site for a new hospital, after a consultation process. Some campaigners had hoped that the central hub of services in Skye could have been based at Portree Hospital; however the Scottish Health Council has pronounced the process followed by the board as legitimate.

In 2017, the board reduced the number of main administrative buildings: refitting Assynt House, which the board owns, and reorganising Larch House, which is leased.

In 2017 the Highland PICT Team is started as a trial.

In 2020, Skyports, a drone delivery service provider, began delivering pathology samples, medicine, essential personal protective equipment and COVID-19 testing kits in Argyll and Bute.  Delivery should take only 30 minutes, where previously it has taken 48 hours. Communication  will be provided by Vodafone's 4G network and satellite communications. The plan is to integrate the operation into the local NHS supply chain.

March 2022, the PICT Team was awarded Highland Hero Emergency Services Hero of the Year.

Training initiatives
In 2011 NHS Highland announced it would be running a week-long "boot camp" for junior surgeons at Raigmore Hospital, Inverness.

Prehospital Care

NHS Highland funds and runs a specialist pre-hospital care team comprising a senior doctor and an advanced practitioner (nurse or paramedic).  This is known as the Prehospital Immediate Care and Trauma (PICT) Team. The name being a play on words in relation to the Picts, the group of peoples who lived in what is now northern and eastern Scotland (north of the Firth of Forth) during Late Antiquity and the Early Middle Ages. The team was the winner of the 2022 Highland Heroes awards in the category of Emergency Services. 

PICT currently operates 12 hours per day, seven days a week, responding to around 150 patients a month.  The PICT Team responds by land to major trauma (as an integrated part of the Scottish Trauma Network) and critically unwell patients in the Highlands of Scotland. The doctor on the PICT Care will also assume the role of the medical incident officer when required at a major incident.  The PICT Team have attended a variety of incidents, including aircraft crashes, road traffic collisions, stabbings, shootings and critically unwell patients.

NHS Highland announced in early 2022 that they would defund the Inverness PICT Team, in steps which will leave the Highlands and Inverness without a seven-day physician-led enhanced care service. This led to the local MSP Sir Edward Mountain to campaign to save this prehospital resource from defunding. Mountain stated that "This pioneering service is essential when responding to major trauma incidents across the Highlands  we simply cannot afford to lose it."

Hospitals

NHS Highland is responsible for a number of different types of hospital - a large district general hospital, 3 rural general hospitals, a psychiatric hospital and a number of community hospitals

District general hospital
 Raigmore Hospital, Inverness

Rural general hospitals
 Caithness General Hospital, Wick
 Belford Hospital, Fort William
 Lorn and Islands Hospital, Oban

Psychiatric hospitals 
 Argyll and Bute Hospital, Lochgilphead
 New Craigs Hospital, Inverness

Community hospitals
 Badenoch and Strathspey Community Hospital, Aviemore
 Campbeltown Hospital, Campbeltown
 County Community Hospital, Invergordon
 Cowal Community Hospital, Dunoon 
 Dunbar Hospital, Thurso
 Mackinnon Memorial Hospital, Broadford on Skye
 Islay Hospital, Bowmore
 Lawson Memorial Hospital, Golspie
 Mid Argyll Community Hospital, Lochgilphead
 Migdale Hospital, Bonar Bridge
 Mull and Iona Community Hospital, Isle of Mull
 Nairn Town and County Hospital, Nairn
 Portree Hospital, Portree
 RNI Community Hospital, Inverness
 Ross Memorial Hospital, Dingwall
 St Vincent's Hospital, Kingussie
 Victoria Hospital, Rothesay
 Victoria Integrated Care Centre, Helensburgh
 Wick Town and County Hospital, Wick

Primary Care
The board started tests of the GP Near Me service with patients of Riverview Practice in Wick, Caithness in October 2018; with patients booking video appointments if a face-to-face appointment is not required.  A similar system NHS Near Me has been used in Caithness for hospital outpatient appointments.

See also
 Glencoe House

References

External links 

 

 
Health in Highland (council area)
Organisations based in Inverness
2004 establishments in Scotland
Health in Argyll and Bute